Nodo (hangul: 노도; hanja: 路鼗) is a set of two small drums on a pole, which is twisted to play; used in Korean ritual and court music. Not to be confused with the nogo, two drums, but much larger, pierced also by a pole and used in the same ceremonies

Directly struck membranophones
Drums
Korean musical instruments
Asian percussion instruments
Musical instruments played with drum sticks
Unpitched percussion instruments
Korean traditional music